Srinivas Institute of Medical Sciences and Research Centre is a medical college and medical centre outside Surathkal in Mukka, Mangalore, India. 

Srinivas was started by the A. Shama Rao Foundation inr 2009.

Description
Srinivas is affiliated with Rajiv Gandhi University of Health Sciences in Bangalore and is recognized by the Medical Council of India (MCI).

Srinivas serves the Tulu linguistic minority category, with a few seats are reserved for Tulu candidates. Admissions to MBBS course is through All India entrance test (NEET) and the total intake per year is 150.

Medical campus is in mukka

About the foundation
The A. Shama Rao Foundation operates a group of higher education institutions in India.  The foundation was established in 1988 in memory of Adka Shama Rao

References

External links
 https://web.archive.org/web/20131227185118/http://www.srinivasgroup.com/medical/
 https://web.archive.org/web/20130607111811/http://www.mciindia.org/InformationDesk/ForStudents/ListofCollegesTeachingMBBS.aspx
 http://www.mciindia.org/Assessment_Reports/5381_922012172540.pdf
 List of educational institutions in Mangalore

Medical colleges in Karnataka
Universities and colleges in Mangalore